Changrabandha  is a railway station serving Changrabandha in Mekhliganj CD block, Cooch Behar district  in the Indian state of West Bengal.

History
The Lalmonirhat–Malbazar metre-gauge line was developed by the Bengal Dooars Railway in the closing years of the nineteenth century.

Present status
The line between New Mal Jn. and Changrabandha is now (2016) converted to broad gauge. The introduction of the train services were delayed as a result of delay in environmental clearance. However a pair of DMUs have been introduced on this route from Siliguri to Changrabandha via New Mal Jn from 20 January 2016. There is a train from New Cooch Behar to Siliguri Jn via Changrabandha.

The Bangladeshi side of the line is still functional. There are 2 commuter trains daily between Burimari and Lalmonirhat.

References

Railway stations in Jalpaiguri district
Alipurduar railway division